Creaserinus gordoni, the Camp Shelby burrowing crayfish, is a species of crayfish in the family Cambaridae. It is found in Mississippi.

The IUCN conservation status of Creaserinus gordoni is "NT", near threatened. The species may be considered threatened in the near future. The IUCN status was reviewed in 2010.

References

Further reading

 
 
 

Cambaridae
Articles created by Qbugbot
Crustaceans described in 1987
Taxa named by Joseph F. Fitzpatrick Jr.